Philippe Viannay (15 August 1917 - 27 November 1986) was a French journalist.

School foundation
He founded the Centre de formation des journalistes, and, later, the sailing school Les Glénans.

French resistance
During World War II, he led a resistance movement named Défense de la France. They printed an underground journal which  distributed up to 400,000 copies.

Personal
The Canadian journalist Caitlin Kelly—who studied with Viannay at the Centre in Paris on an eighth-month journalism fellowship—later described him as "the most inspiring man I've ever met."

Hélène Viannay
During the first year of the German occupation, Viannay married the former Hélène Mordkovitch. Hélène Viannay co-administered Les Glénans with her husband, and following Viannay's death became president of the association of Ancient Résistants of Défense de la France.

Prix Philippe Viannay-Défense de la France
The French Fondation de la Résistance awards an annual prize for resistance-era histories, the Prix Philippe Viannay-Défense de la France.

References

French Resistance members
1917 births
1986 deaths
Place of birth missing
Place of death missing
French male non-fiction writers
20th-century French journalists
20th-century French male writers